Keep On is the third studio album by English singer Will Young. It was released on 21 November 2005, debuting at number 2 on the albums chart in the United Kingdom, as the album sold 107,318 copies in its first week. However, its biggest sales were 132,109, in its fifth week when the album placed at number 13. This is also his first album not to go number 1. It is, however, his second best-selling album, with sales of 1,010,000.

Critical reception

Allmusic editor Sharon Mawer found that "there was a mixture of styles on Keep On, from the salsa, holiday-inspired "Happiness" to the Justin Timberlake pastiche of "Ain't Such a Bad Place to Be," on which even the Indian-style intro worked well, to the ballads "Save Yourself," "Who Am I," and the final song, "Home," a haunting atmospheric track co-written by Nitin Sawhney. Keep On ran out of steam near the end with three tracks, all again co-written by Young but nothing more than album fillers, none of them having much of a melody [...] Altogether an excellent pop album from an artist who was maturing very nicely as the years went by."

Track listing

 signifies an additional producer

Charts

Weekly charts

Year-end charts

Certifications

References

2005 albums
Will Young albums
Albums produced by Robin Thicke
Albums produced by Stephen Lipson
19 Recordings albums
Sony BMG albums